The Brothers (親情) is a TVB television series which premiered on 21 April 1980. The show's theme song "The Brothers" (親情), was composed and arranged by Joseph Koo, with Wong Jim, writing the lyrics. It was originally sung by Cantopop singer, Roman Tam.

1980s Hong Kong television series
1980 Hong Kong television series debuts
1980 Hong Kong television series endings
TVB dramas
Cantonese-language television shows